Kim Hyun-seok (born May 5, 1967) is a South Korean former football striker. He mostly played for Ulsan Hyundai Horang-i and played for Verdy Kawasaki of Japan 1 year.

He is called Legend of K-League. He is first K-League 50–50 club member. He appeared in 371 games in his whole K-League career, scored 110 goals and made 54 assists. His appearance and goal score were recorded K-League most app. and goals.

Club statistics

National team statistics

International goals
Results list South Korea's goal tally first.

References

Kim Hyun-seok interview at KFA.com

External links
 Kim Hyun-seok – National Team stats at KFA 
 
 
 

1967 births
Living people
Association football forwards
South Korean footballers
South Korean expatriate footballers
South Korea international footballers
Ulsan Hyundai FC players
Gimcheon Sangmu FC players
Tokyo Verdy players
K League 1 players
K League 1 Most Valuable Player Award winners
J1 League players
Expatriate footballers in Japan
South Korean expatriate sportspeople in Japan
People from Samcheok